Viot is a surname. Notable people with the surname include:

 Bernard Viot (born 1937), French racing cyclist
 Jacques Viot (1921–2012), French academic and diplomat
 Jacques Viot (writer) (1898–1973), French novelist and screenwriter
 Patrick Viot (1952–2021), French footballer
 Pierre Viot (1925–2020), French executive
 Vincent Viot (born 1994), French football goalkeeper

See also

 Vicot (surname)

Other uses
 13251 Viot
 Fleming–Viot process